Patricia Birch (born October 16, 1934) is an American dancer, choreographer, film director, and theatre director.

Early life

Born in Englewood, New Jersey, Birch began her career as a dancer in Broadway musicals, including Brigadoon, Goldilocks, and West Side Story (playing Anybodys). She has directed and choreographed music videos for Cyndi Lauper, The Rolling Stones, and Carly Simon.

She earned Emmy Awards for her direction of the television specials Natalie Cole: Unforgettable and Celebrating Gershwin and, in collaboration with Michael Tilson Thomas, she staged the concert version of On the Town performed by both the London Symphony Orchestra and the San Francisco Symphony. She spent six years staging numbers for Saturday Night Live. In the 1960s, she taught dance at the Juilliard School's pre-college division in New York City. She performed as a soloist with Martha Graham and Agnes de Mille.

Work

Film
The Electric Company (1971)
Savages (1973)
The Wild Party (1975)
Roseland (1977)
A Little Night Music (1977)
Grease (1978)
Grease 2 (1982) also director
Christmas with Flicka (1987) 
Big (1988)
Elvira: Mistress of the Dark (1988)
The Orchestra (fr. L'orchestre, 1989)
Stella (1990)
Billy Bathgate (1991)
Sleeping with the Enemy (1991)
This Is My Life (1992)
Used People (1992)
North (1994)
The First Wives Club (1996)
The Human Stain (2003)
The Stepford Wives (2004)

Stage productions (selected)
All credits as choreographer unless otherwise noted
West Side Story (1960 Broadway) (performer)
The Me Nobody Knows (1970) (Musical Staging)
You're a Good Man, Charlie Brown (1971 Broadway musical)
Grease (1972 Broadway musical)
A Little Night Music (1973 Broadway musical)
Over Here! (1974 Broadway musical)
Pacific Overtures (1976 Broadway musical)
They're Playing Our Song (1979 Broadway musical)
Zoot Suit (1981 Broadway play)
Raggedy Ann (1986 Broadway musical also director)
Anna Karenina (1992 Broadway musical)
Candide (1997 Broadway musical)
Parade (1998 Broadway musical)
Lovemusik (2007 Broadway musical)

Awards and nominations
Awards
1972 Drama Desk Award – Grease
1974 Drama Desk Award – Candide
2009 Induction into the American Theater Hall of Fame
Nominations
1972 Tony Award – Grease
1974 Tony Award – Over Here!
1976 Drama Desk Award – Pacific Overtures
1976 Tony Award – Pacific Overtures
1977 Drama Desk Award – Music Is
1977 Tony Award – Music Is
1999 Drama Desk Award – Parade
1999 Tony Award – Parade
2007 Drama Desk Award – LoveMusik

References

External links
 
 

American choreographers
American female dancers
American dancers
American television directors
American women film directors
American women television directors
Emmy Award winners
Drama Desk Award winners
Living people
People from Englewood, New Jersey
Film directors from New Jersey
1928 births
21st-century American women